Patel Nagar is one of the 3 sub-division of the West Delhi District in India.

Area
Patel Nagar is a large area and divided into the following colonies:

West Patel Nagar
East Patel Nagar
South Patel Nagar

Neighbouring Areas
Patel Nagar's neighboring areas are Nehru Nagar, Baljit Nagar, Pusa Road, Rajendra Place, New Rajendra Nagar, Old Rajendra Nagar, Prasad Nagar, Shadipur, Karol Bagh,  Baba Farid Puri, Inderpuri, Pusa Institute, Tank Road, Shankar Road, & Naraina.

Metro station
There are three metro stations in or near Patel Nagar: Rajendra Place, Patel Nagar and Shadipur. The Shadipur Metro Station is suitable for traveling to some parts of West Patel Nagar, Baljit Nagar and Baba Farid Puri. Patel Nagar metro station is suitable for traveling to some parts of South Patel Nagar, East Patel Nagar and West Patel Nagar. Rajendra Place (close to Jaypee Siddharth) metro station is suitable for traveling to some parts of East Patel Nagar and South Patel Nagar.

Politics 

Patel Nagar comes under the jurisdiction of New Delhi (Lok Sabha constituency). The current MP is Meenakshi Lekhi of Bhartiya Janata Party.

References

Neighbourhoods in Delhi
District subdivisions of Delhi
West Delhi district